Kyle B. Sweeney is an American football coach and former player.  He is the head coach for the Claremont-Mudd-Scripps Stags football program, a position he has held since 2011. From 2007 to 2008, Sweeney was the head coach at MacMurray College in Jacksonville, Illinois.  Prior to arriving at Claremont, he was the defensive coordinator at the University of Chicago from 2009 to 2010.

Head coaching record

College

References

External links
 Claremont-Mudd-Scripps profile

Year of birth missing (living people)
Living people
American football safeties
Chicago Maroons football coaches
Claremont-Mudd-Scripps Stags football coaches
MacMurray Highlanders football coaches
Occidental Tigers football coaches
Occidental Tigers football players
Illinois Wesleyan Titans football coaches